The EF 11–24 mm 4L USM lens is a professional wide-angle lens made by Canon Inc. It was announced on February 5, 2015, and at that time was the widest rectilinear lens ever made for the 35 mm format in either its film or digital versions.

The lens has an EF mount to work with the EOS line of cameras. Other than the front element, it is sealed against dust and water, and features a diaphragm which remains nearly circular. It produces minimally distorted images.

Specifications

Gallery

Similar lenses
 Nikon AF-S 14–24 mm f/2.8G IF-ED Lens. The Canon 11–24 mm has a wider field of view than the Nikon 14–24 mm, however, they are similar in size, weight, and intended usage.
 Sigma 12–24 mm f/4 DG HSM ART

References

External links

Canon EF lenses